Bruce Walker (born 8 June 1952) is an Australian former rugby league footballer who played in the 1970s and 1980s.

Playing career
An Australian Kangaroos and Queensland Maroons representative second-row or lock forward, he played club football in Brisbane with Eastern Suburbs before moving to Sydney to play with North Sydney for seven seasons between 1971 and 1977, and later Manly-Warringah with whom he won the 1978 Grand Final and played for six seasons between 1978 and 1983. Walker was then selected to go on the 1978 Kangaroo tour, playing in 8 matches.

Post playing
Following his retirement as a player Walker became chairman of the South Australian Rugby League.

References

External links
'Bruce Walker' at fogs.com.au
'Bruce Walker' at yesterdayshero.com.au
'Queensland representative listing' at qrl.com.au
'Bears History: Legends' at northsydneybears.com.au

1952 births
Australian rugby league players
Eastern Suburbs Tigers players
North Sydney Bears players
Queensland Rugby League State of Origin players
Australia national rugby league team players
Manly Warringah Sea Eagles players
New South Wales rugby league team players
Australian rugby league administrators
Living people
Rugby league locks
Rugby league second-rows
Rugby league props